Simeon Račanin (1676–1700) was a Serbian Orthodox monk and translator. He is mentioned in 1700 along with several other monks at the Rača monastery, all wearing the epithet Račanin: Kiprijan Račanin, Jerotej Račanin, Hristifor Račanin, Ćirjak Račanin, Teodor Račanin, and Gavrilo Stefanović Venclović-Račanin. One of Simeon's works, dated to 1676, is held at the National Museum (Prague).

He was one of an elite group of educated and anonymous monks (addressed only by their monastic name) of the Monastery of Rača in Bajina Bašta, near the Drina River, to make his mark in the eighteenth-century Serbian literature. All the members of the School of Rača spoke and wrote little about their past; giving precedent to the work at hand. We do know, however, that Simeon was orphaned early, and brought up by his relations. He was sent to the Rača Monastery where he received an excellent education for the period. He learned Greek, Latin, Old Church Slavonic and most of the Slavic dialects and languages, including Russian and Polish.

Works
The Museum of the Serbian Orthodox Church is in possession of a small number of ornately decorated manuscripts by unknown scribes, though a few have been identified, namely Simeon Račanin.

See also
Gavrilo Stefanović Venclović
Čirjak Račanin (1660–1731), Serbian Orthodox monk and writer
Kiprijan Račanin (1650–1730), Serbian Orthodox monk and writer
Jerotej Račanin (1650–1727), Serbian Orthodox monk and writer
Teodor Račanin (1500–1560), Serbian Orthodox monk and writer
Hristifor Račanin (1595–1670), Serbian Orthodox monk and writer
Prohor Račanin, Serbian Orthodox monk
Grigorije Račanin ( 1739), Serbian writer
Jefrem Janković Tetovac

References

Sources

17th-century Serbian people
Serbian monks
Serbian translators
Serbian Orthodox clergy
17th-century writers
Serbs from the Ottoman Empire